Ragnar Sigtryggsson (26 May 1925 – 31 March 2009) was an Icelandic footballer. He played in one match for the Iceland national football team in 1957.

References

External links
 

1925 births
2009 deaths
Ragnar Sigtryggsson
Ragnar Sigtryggsson
Place of birth missing
Association footballers not categorized by position